The West Somerville Branch Library is a historic library at 40 College Avenue in Somerville, Massachusetts, just outside Davis Square. It is an example of Classical Revival architecture, built in 1909 with funding support from Andrew Carnegie, and was the city's first branch library. It was listed on the National Register of Historic Places in 1989.

Architecture and history
The West Somerville Branch Library is located on the west side of College Avenue, opposite Morrison Avenue, on the north side of Davis Square. It is a 1-1/2 story granite structure, with elaborate Classical Revival styling. The main facade, facing roughly southeast, is three bays wide, with a center projection housing the entrance, which is set in a round-arch opening flanked by fluted Ionic columns and broad square pilasters. The entry columns support a gabled pediment with a modillioned cornice. The building's corners are quoined, and it is capped by a shallow-pitch hip roof with a modillioned cornice. On each side of the building is a projecting round bay.

The building was designed by McLean & Wright of Boston, and was built in 1906-09 with funding from philanthropist Andrew Carnegie and the city. It is the city's best example of Classical Revival architecture, also exhibiting Beaux Arts details that were then in fashion. It was the first branch library in Somerville. The library has served the city since opening in 1909; it is part of the Minuteman Library Network system.

See also
National Register of Historic Places listings in Somerville, Massachusetts
Central Library (Somerville, Massachusetts)

References

External links
Branch Hours
Library Website

Library buildings completed in 1909
Libraries on the National Register of Historic Places in Massachusetts
Buildings and structures in Somerville, Massachusetts
Libraries in Middlesex County, Massachusetts
National Register of Historic Places in Somerville, Massachusetts